R. J. Glen (born April 19, 1851) was an American politician in the state of Washington. He served in the Washington House of Representatives from 1895 to 1897.

References

Members of the Washington House of Representatives
1851 births
Year of death missing